The Kuray Mountains are a mountain range in the Altai Republic, Russia.

Description
Bounded to the south by the Kuray and Chuya Basins, the Kuray mountains form the northern part of a metamorphic dome complex.

Major rivers flow from the Kuray mountains predominantly to the north, where they continue for several hundred kilometres through the northern Altai Mountains, passing through Lake Teletskoye.

See also
List of mountains and hills of Russia

References

Mountain ranges of Russia
Landforms of the Altai Republic
Altai Mountains